John Frederic Coulon (February 12, 1889 – October 29, 1973) was the World Bantamweight Champion from March 6, 1910, when he wrested the crown from England's Jim Kendrick, until June 3, 1914, when he was defeated by Kid Williams in Vernon, California.

As there was some dispute over the sanctioning of the World Bantamweight Title by different boxing associations, other sources, particularly many American newspapers of the day, and the World Boxing Association, which became the National Boxing Association, recognized his first taking the bantamweight world championship on February 26, 1911, when he defeated Frankie Conley in twenty rounds in New Orleans, Louisiana.

Early life
Born in Toronto to American parents Emile Eugene Coulon (1857–1911) and Sarah Loretta Waltzinger (1857–1923), Coulon grew up in turn-of-the-century Chicago, where, as a prelim fighter, he became known as "The Cherry Picker from Logan Square."  In the summer of 1906, at the age of seventeen, he received a life saving medal from the U.S. government, and was matched to fight Danny Goodman in Davenport, winning the eight-round match.  According to the Chicago Tribune, it may have been his professional debut, but was certainly one of his first. He began fighting as an amateur in Chicago two years earlier, once appearing in Kid Howard's Gymnasium, weighing barely one hundred pounds for some bouts. According to his Boxrec record, he won roughly fifteen fights as an amateur, frequently by knockout.

Early boxing career
Coulon turned pro at 16 and was a champion at 21. His career, managed by his father, Emile E. "Pop" Coulon, stretched from 1905 to 1920. Counting newspaper decisions, the hall-of-famer, according to Boxrec, is listed as losing only eleven times in 91 fights, but he claimed to have fought over 300 total bouts.

Coulon won 26 of his early bouts before losing a 10-round decision to Kid Murphy. In a rematch with Murphy in 1908, Coulon reversed the decision and earned recognition as the American bantamweight champion, though the title was billed as the Paperweight World Title, and not recognized as the World Bantamweight Title by all sanctioning bodies.

Boxing career and taking the World Bantamweight Title
After an important win against Jim Kendrick in 19 rounds on February 18, 1910, in New Orleans, Louisiana, he later defeated him again in a nineteen-round battle in the same city where he won by technical knockout.  The fights were billed as the "Paperweight World Championships" at a weight of 8 stones, 3 pounds or 115 pounds in American weight measure.  Not all sanctioning bodies recognized this fight as bestowing the World Bantamweight Championship.  Coulon defended the title against Earl Denning, Frankie Conley, Frankie Burns, and Kid Williams. Three of his opponents were Hall-of-Famers: Kid Williams, Pete Herman, and Charley Goldman, who is best known for training Rocky Marciano. He also faced Harry Forbes, a gifted bantamweight from Chicago, and brother of boxer Clarence.

His April 10, 1910, ten round New York bout at the Marathon Athletic Club in Brooklyn with Young O'Leary was another close affair with Coulon winning by "having only a shade the better of the round." The reporter for the article felt O'Leary was weakened in his attempt to make the 112 pound fighting weight, and thus had a disadvantage in the bout. The fight was considered a title fight for the "Paperweight World Championship at 115 pounds, though both fighters were under that limit. Some sources still considered the fight for the Bantamweight World Championship.

Undisputedly taking the World Bantamweight Title

On year after his win against Kendrick, many sources consider his 20 round points decision over Frankie Conley on February 26, 1911 in New Orleans, Louisiana, as bestowing the World Bantamweight Title for the first time at age 22.  In the historic bout at the West Side Athletic Club, both men gave equal punishment throughout the bout with Conley still able to throw punches in the final twentieth round. Believing Coulon still a clear winner of the bout, the Indianapolis Star, gave eighteen of the twenty rounds to Coulon, though not by wide margins.

In March and April 1911, Coulon fought Phil McGovern and Harry Forbes in ten round no decision title matches in Kenosha, Wisconsin. Forbes had been recognized as the World Bantamweight Boxing Champion from 1901 to 1903 by the World Boxing Association. Though there was no referee decision on points, if Coulon lost the fight by knockout or technical knockout before the ten rounds were completed, he still would have forfeited his title.  Both bouts went the full ten rounds, and several newspapers gave Coulon the edge in the bouts.

Of his February 18, 1912 twenty round World Bantamweight Title Fight victory in New Orleans over Frankie Burns, the press wrote that he had the only knockdown in the fast paced and well matched fight and that, "the crowd was loathe to leave" and the "yelling was deafening". As late as the eighteenth and nineteenth round, Burns was fighting back with jabs to the face of Coulon, though the close fight ended with a points decision for Coulon. Both men were fighting hard til the final bell.  Part of the crowd's deafening yells were a result of the closeness of the fight and that many felt Burns should have gotten a draw decision.  The Washington Post felt that Burns may have had the better of the seventeenth through twentieth rounds.

As a boxer who became a performer, his June 11, 1912, bout with Frankie Hayes in New Haven, Connecticut, was not exceedingly rare in this era of boxing. With the demanding schedule many boxers kept, where injuries and fatigue were both common, boxers would on very rare occasions perform more than box.  The bout's original referee Fitzgerald left the ring after the third of ten rounds declaring the bout was a "frame-up" and that the boxers were refusing to fight.  That a World Champion might fix a fight was rare but not unheard of in this era, as sometimes organized crime exerted major influence on the outcome of fights. A Police Chief Cowles warned both fighters to box, and finally in the fourth round Hayes went down by knockout, though the crowd was not convinced the knockout was genuine or staged. Bouts of this type often left the audience and law enforcement officials wondering if a "fix" was involved due to pressures from gamblers or organized crime to effect an outcome favorable to their betting.

One source noted a slight decline in Coulon's boxing style after the death of his father Emile E. "Pop" Coulon on July 28, 1911, with his telling loss to Kid Williams three years later in June 1914. From July 28 though December 1912, Coulon took a six-month boxing hiatus which may have reduced his competitiveness.  His unwillingness to take a new manager after the loss of his father, may have simply reduced his ability to schedule frequent bouts with top boxers and thus reduced his incentive to train. A higher percentage of his better publicized fights in late 1912 were draws, with a lower percentage of wins by decision of the referees.

Losing the World Bantamweight Title

Coulon indisputedly lost the World Bantamweight Title when Kid Williams stopped him in a lop-sided victory ending in a third-round knockout on June 9, 1914, in Vernon, California.  Coulon made "only a feeble resistance" in the June title bout with Williams, before a crowd of 10,700, and as he lost the bout in less than nine minutes of total fighting, New York's Evening World, wrote that "he slid into obscurity with barely a protest."

Coulon served in the United States Army during World War I, often instructing soldiers on how to fight. He fought no well-known professional bouts from May 1917 though March 1920, while America was at war. He boxed twice in France after his service stint with Charles Ledoux and Emile Juliard in 1920, and retired from the ring that year with a total record including newspaper decisions of 67 wins, 11 losses, 12 draws, with 1 no-contest.

Retirement from boxing
After retirement, he began public performances with a mystifying stage act. He would appear stripped to the waist and challenge anyone in the audience to try to lift him off his feet. It seemed an empty boast since at five feet and barely 110 pounds, he was smaller than many schoolboys. But those who took up the challenge soon left the stage baffled and frustrated when they were unable to lift Coulon an inch off the floor. Coulon himself never made any extravagant claims that he could violate natural laws. He was content to make a living by presenting a baffling stage act. The trick was that Coulon would feign a struggle, grabbing the opponent by the back of the neck and right arm and applying pressure to a nerve there. Once he even successfully prevented imposing heavyweight Primo Carnera from lifting him off the floor.  His act also included what he described as levitation and his appearing to lose and gain weight at will.

Marriage and opening Coulon's gymnasium
On July 27, 1921, at the end of his boxing career, Coulon married his diminutive Irish wife of over fifty years, Marie Maloney (1892–1984), a native Chicagoan. She never saw him fight professionally, but together they opened Coulon's Gymnasium on the South Side of Chicago around 1923.  Marie was the business manager, and helped to match fighters who performed at the gym both as professionals and amateurs. Coulon's professional career was over when they met, but together they saw many of the great boxers train at their gym down thru the years — these included Jack Dempsey, Gene Tunney, Jim Braddock, Joe Louis, Sugar Ray Robinson, and Muhammad Ali." Ali would often use the gym to keep himself toned during his exile years. Coulon managed junior welterweight champion Eddie Perkins and light-heavyweight contender Allen Thomas.  Coulon often travelled to find Perkins fights even into his 70s.

Ernest Hemingway visited Coulon's and insisted on sparring with the local pugs. LeRoy Neiman sketched boxers working out. A cult movie of the sixties, Medium Cool, filmed scenes at the gym, where Coulon briefly appeared, a tiny old man captured forever on celluloid.

Coulon was not only a topnotch trainer, but living boxing history. He was a close friend of Jack Johnson, had frequented Johnson's restaurant, the "Café de Champion," and served as a pallbearer at the great champion's funeral. He knew every heavyweight champion since the Great John L. Sullivan, trained hundreds of fighters and was a revered celebrity in Chicago during the 1960s. At 76 he could leave a ring by jumping over a top rope, landing softly on his feet. He celebrated a birthday by walking the length of the gym on his hands. He died at 84 in 1973 in Chicago and was buried in St. Mary's Cemetery along with his wife.  His gym was later torn down. In 2016 all rights to the boxer was given to a relative by the name of Brenden Wirth.

Achievements and honors
Coulon was inducted into Canada's Sports Hall of Fame in 1955 (Sport: Boxing; Theme: Strength & Science), was installed in the Catholic Youth Organization's Club of Champions for his contributions to amateur boxing in 1971, and into the International Boxing Hall of Fame in 1999.  He was elected to New York's Boxing Hall of Fame on January 6, 1966.

Professional boxing record
All information in this section is derived from BoxRec, unless otherwise stated.

Official record

All newspaper decisions are officially regarded as “no decision” bouts and are not counted in the win/loss/draw column.

Unofficial record

Record with the inclusion of newspaper decisions in the win/loss/draw column.

See also
List of bantamweight boxing champions

References

External links
 
Johnny Coulon - CBZ Profile

|-

1889 births
1973 deaths
Bantamweight boxers
Boxers from Chicago
Canadian people of American descent
Canadian male boxers
Canadian emigrants to the United States
Boxers from Toronto
United States Army personnel of World War I
American male boxers